The 1981 South African Open was a men's tennis tournament played on outdoor hard courts in Johannesburg, South Africa that was part of the 1981 Volvo Grand Prix. It was the 78th edition of the tournament and was held from 21 November through 28 November 1981. First-seeded Vitas Gerulaitis won the singles title.

Finals

Singles
 Vitas Gerulaitis defeated  Jeff Borowiak 6–4, 7–6, 6–1

Doubles
 John Yuill /  Terry Moor defeated  Fritz Buehning /  Russell Simpson 6–3, 5–7, 6–4, 6–7, 12–10

References

External links
 ITF tournament edition details

South African Open
South African Open (tennis)
Open
Sports competitions in Johannesburg
1980s in Johannesburg
November 1981 sports events in Africa